Jetfire is the name of several fictional characters from the Transformers franchise.

Jetfire may also refer to:
Beretta 950 Jetfire, a semi-automatic pistol designed and manufactured by Beretta
Oldsmobile Jetfire, a 1962 Oldsmobile and the first ever turbocharged production car